Arra is a census town in the Raghunathpur I CD block in the Raghunathpur subdivision of the Puruliya district in the state of West Bengal, India.

Geography

Location

Area overview
Purulia district forms the lowest step of the Chota Nagpur Plateau. The general scenario is undulating land with scattered hills. Raghunathpur subdivision occupies the northern part of the district. 83.80% of the population of the subdivision  lives in rural areas. However, there are pockets of urbanization and 16.20% of the population lives in urban areas. There are 14 census towns in the subdivision. It is presented in the map given alongside. There is a coal mining area around Parbelia and two thermal power plants are there – the 500 MW Santaldih Thermal Power Station and the 1200 MW Raghunathpur Thermal Power Station. The subdivision has a rich heritage of old temples, some of them belonging to the 11th century or earlier. The Banda Deul is a monument of national importance. The comparatively more recent in historical terms, Panchkot Raj has interesting and intriguing remains in the area.

Note: The map alongside presents some of the notable locations in the subdivision. All places marked in the map are linked in the larger full screen map.

Demographics
According to the 2011 Census of India, Arra had a total population of 21,272, of which 11,135 (52%) were males and 10,137 (48%) were females. There were 2,063 persons in the age range of 0–6 years. The total number of literate persons in Arra was 15,604 (81.23% of the population over 6 years).

 India census, Arra had a population of 19,911. Males constitute 52% of the population and females 48%. Arra has an average literacy rate of 66%, higher than the national average of 59.5%; with 59% of the males and 41% of females literate. 12% of the population is under 6 years of age.

Infrastructure
According to the District Census Handbook 2011, Puruliya, Arra covered an area of 8.64 km2. There is a railway station at Adra, 1 km away. Among the civic amenities, the protected water supply involved uncovered well, tube-well, bore-well. It had 1,665 domestic electric connections. Among the medical facilities it had 1 dispensary/ health centre. Among the educational facilities it had were 8 primary schools, 3 middle schools, the nearest secondary school, the nearest senior secondary school at Adra 1 km away, the nearest general degree college at Raghunathpur 8 km away. It had 2 special schools for disabled. Three important commodities it produced were paddy, clay pots and bamboo products.

Education
Barabagan Junior High School is a Bengali-medium coeducational institution established in 2009. It has facilities for teaching from class V to class VIII.

References

Cities and towns in Purulia district